Kentucky Women Remembered is an exhibit in the Kentucky State Capitol that honors the contributions of women from the Commonwealth. The exhibit consists of over 60 watercolor portraits of outstanding Kentucky women. The Kentucky Commission on Women receives nominations and selects two to four honorees each year to be included. The exhibit includes famous Kentucky musicians Loretta Lynn and Rosemary Clooney as well as civic leaders Mae Street Kidd and Georgia Davis Powers.

Governor Edward T. Breathitt established a commission on the status of Kentucky women in April 1964. The commission determined that Kentucky women's status would be improved through a permanent agency and Governor Louie Nunn signed an executive order establishing the Kentucky Commission on Women in November 1968. Legislative action made the Commission official in 1970. In 1978, the Kentucky Commission on Women started a campaign to recognize Kentucky women that history had overlooked. The exhibit "Kentucky Women Excel" began at that year's Kentucky State Fair. In 1996 the exhibit was moved to a first floor hallway of the west wing of the Capitol building. The first 17 portraits were created by artist Paula Jull. Other portrait artists that have created works for the exhibit include Alison Davis Lyne and Mary Lou Hall.

The Kentucky Women Remembered Committee accepts nominations for new honorees. Nominees may be living or deceased and must have been born in Kentucky or spent a significant part of their lives living in the state. Candidates are required to be role models, to have strengthened Kentucky or the United States through their work, and to have shown leadership in elevating the status of women. New portraits are typically unveiled at a ceremony that takes place during Women's History Month in March.

Honorees

See also
Kentucky Foundation for Women
List of Kentucky women in the civil rights era

Footnotes

References
 

 
 

 McEuen, Melissa A. et al. eds. Kentucky Women: Their Lives and Times (U of Georgia Press, 2015) online review

External links
Kentucky Women Remembered. Kentucky Commission on Women.
List of honorees
Women in Kentucky, a Kentucky Commission on Women project

1978 establishments in Kentucky
Halls of fame in Kentucky
Lists of American women
State halls of fame in the United States
Women in Kentucky
Women's halls of fame
Frankfort, Kentucky